Latour may refer to:

People
 LaTour, American musician

Surname
 House of Baillet
Alfred de Baillet Latour (1901–1980), 
Henri de Baillet-Latour (1876–1942), Belgian aristocrat and the third president of the International Olympic Committee
Maximilian Anton Karl, Count Baillet de Latour (1737–1806), a general in Austrian service
Theodor Franz, Count Baillet von Latour (1780–1848), Austrian soldier and statesman
Bertrand Latour (born 1963), French writer published by Éditions Denoël
Bruno Latour (1947-2022), French sociologist
 Georges de Latour, founder of Beaulieu Vineyard in Rutherford, California
Hanspeter Latour (born 1947), Swiss football manager and former goalkeeper
Henri Fantin-Latour (1836–1904), French painter and lithographer
Joseph Latour (1806-1863), French Romantic Drawer and painter
Jason Latour, American comic book artist and writer
Jean Théodore Latour (1766–1837), composer
José Latour (born 1940), Cuban crime fiction writer
Peter Scholl-Latour (1924–2014), German-French journalist and publicist
Pierre Latour (born 1993), French cyclist
Phyllis Latour (born 1921), female Special Operations Executive spy during World War II
René de Latour (1906–1986), Franco-American sports journalist and cycling race director
Tuffield A. Latour (1909–1965), American Olympic bobsledder 
Tuffield Latour (born c. 1968), American bobsledder, grandson of Tuffield A. Latour

Places
Latour, Suriname, resort in Paramaribo District

France
Marnhagues-et-Latour, Aveyron
Miramont-Latour, Gers
Latour, Haute-Garonne
Latour-en-Woëvre, Meuse
Latour-Bas-Elne, Pyrénées-Orientales
Latour-de-Carol, Pyrénées-Orientales
Canton of Latour-de-France, Pyrénées-Orientales
Latour-de-France

Wine
Château Latour, a Bordeaux wine estate in Pauillac, France, France
Château Latour à Pomerol, a Bordeaux wine estate in Pomerol, France
Château Latour-Martillac, a Bordeaux wine estate in Pessac-Léognan, France
Maison Louis Latour, a wine producer based in Burgundy, France
 Georges de Latour, cuvée name of Beaulieu Vineyard in Rutherford, California

Other uses
Latour (restaurant), in Noordwijk, Netherlands
10311 Fantin-Latour, a main-belt asteroid named after Henri Fantin-Latour 
Allard-Latour, a French car
Investment AB Latour, a Swedish investment company

See also

Delatour, a surname
La Tour (surname)
La Tour (disambiguation)
Latur in India 
Tour (disambiguation)
Letour, Tour de France